Psalm 115 is the 115th psalm of the Book of Psalms, beginning in English in the King James Version: "Not unto us, O , not unto us, but unto thy name give glory". It is part of the Egyptian Hallel sequence in the fifth division of the Book of Psalms.

In the slightly different numbering system in the Greek Septuagint and the Latin Vulgate version of the Bible, this psalm forms the second part of Psalm 113, counted as verses 9–26 of Psalm 113, verses 1–8 being Psalm 114 in Hebrew numbering. In Latin, that part is known as "Non nobis".

According to Alexander Kirkpatrick, this psalm "was probably composed for use in the [Second] Temple services after the Return from Babylon", perhaps when the first flush of enthusiasm had died away, and the little community in Jerusalem realised how contemptibly weak it was in the eyes of its neighbours".

The beginning has been used for inscriptions on buildings, such as the Ca' Vendramin Calergi. Verse 16, "The earth has been given to the children of men", among others, motivated John McConnell to create Earth Day.

Psalm 115 is used as a regular part of Jewish, Eastern Orthodox, Catholic, Lutheran, Anglican and various Protestant liturgies. It has often been set to music, such as a setting in German by Heinrich Schütz for three four-part choirs of voices and instruments, and Bach's early wedding cantata . During the Romantic period, Felix Mendelssohn set the psalm in German, Gustav Holst in English, and Albert Kellermann in Hebrew.

Text

Hebrew Bible version 
Following is the Hebrew text of Psalm 115:

King James Version 
 Not unto us, O LORD, not unto us, but unto thy name give glory, for thy mercy, and for thy truth's sake.
 Wherefore should the heathen say, Where is now their God?
 But our God is in the heavens: he hath done whatsoever he hath pleased.
 Their idols are silver and gold, the work of men's hands.
 They have mouths, but they speak not: eyes have they, but they see not:
 They have ears, but they hear not: noses have they, but they smell not:
 They have hands, but they handle not: feet have they, but they walk not: neither speak they through their throat.
 They that make them are like unto them; so is every one that trusteth in them.
 O Israel, trust thou in the LORD: he is their help and their shield.
 O house of Aaron, trust in the LORD: he is their help and their shield.
 Ye that fear the LORD, trust in the LORD: he is their help and their shield.
 The LORD hath been mindful of us: he will bless us; he will bless the house of Israel; he will bless the house of Aaron.
 He will bless them that fear the LORD, both small and great.
 The LORD shall increase you more and more, you and your children.
 Ye are blessed of the LORD which made heaven and earth.
 The heaven, even the heavens, are the LORD's: but the earth hath he given to the children of men.
 The dead praise not the LORD, neither any that go down into silence.
 But we will bless the LORD from this time forth and for evermore. Praise the LORD.

Uses

In Judaism 
Psalm 115 is one of six psalms (113–118) of which Hallel is composed. On all days when Hallel is recited, this psalm is recited in its entirety, except on Rosh Chodesh and the last six days of Passover, when only verses 1–11 are recited. Verse 18 is the final verse of Ashrei. It is also recited by some Jews following Psalm 126 preceding Birkat Hamazon.

In Christianity
The Latin hymn "Non nobis" is based on Psalm 115. Several clergymen chose the beginning for their motto as an expression of humility, including the Italian archbishop Giuseppe Siri and the Filipino archbishop José S. Palma. The first verse in Latin, "Non Nobis Domine" became the motto of the Knights Templar.

Other uses
The beginning has been used for inscriptions on buildings, notably the Venetian Ca' Vendramin Calergi which is even known by the Latin "Non Nobis Domine". Psalm 113 in the Vulgate numbering is said to have been used as a memorial and thanksgiving by Henry V after the Battle of Agincourt:

Verse 16, "The earth has been given to the children of men", has been quoted by peace activist John McConnell as an inspiration to create Earth Day, as a call to preserve the Earth and share resources.

Music 
In his collection Psalmen Davids of psalms, hymns and motets, Heinrich Schütz set Psalm 115 in German "Nicht uns, Herr", for three four-part choirs of voices and instruments, SWV 43. Schütz also set a metric poem for the Becker Psalter, "Nicht uns, nicht uns, Herr, lieber Gott", SWV 213.

Johann Sebastian Bach based his early wedding cantata , on verses 12 to 15 of Psalm 115 which speak of God's blessing especially for families.

Joseph Haydn wrote a four-part setting of the first verse in Latin for choir a cappella as an offertory hymn, published by Carus in 2009. In 1835, Felix Mendelssohn set Psalm 115 in German, Nicht unserm Namen, Herr, Op. 31, for soprano solo, SATB choir and orchestra. Gustav Holst wrote a setting in English, "Not Unto Us, O Lord", for mixed chorus and organ or piano in the 1890s.

Albert Kellermann included Psalm 115 in a collection of Sechs liturgische Psalmen (6 liturgical psalms) in 1913, setting them in Hebrew for choir, soloists and organ. When Siegfried Matthus wrote the libretto to his opera Judith, based on Friedrich Hebbel's Judith and premiered in 1985, he included verses from the Old Testament including Psalm 115. Gerald Cohen set the psalm in Hebrew for SATB chorus and piano in 1987.

References

Bibliography

External links 

 
 
 Psalms Chapter 115 text in Hebrew and English, mechon-mamre.org
 Text of Psalm 115 according to the 1928 Psalter
United States Conference of Catholic Bishops, Not to us, LORD, not to us / but to your name give glory text and footnotes, usccb.org 
 Psalm 115:1 introduction and text, biblestudytools.com
 Psalm 115 – The LORD Our Help and Shield enduringword.com
 Psalm 115 / Refrain: The Lord has been mindful of us and he will bless us. Church of England
 Psalm 115 at biblegateway.com
 Charles Spurgeon: Psalm 115 detailed commentary, archive.spurgeon.org
 

115
Hallel